Coping with the Urban Coyote is the first full release by American rock band Unida on Man's Ruin Records.

Track listing

Re-release with bonus live album 
Disc 1 follows the track listing of the original 1999 LP. On the CD, these tracks appear as tracks 7 through 14.

The bonus live album was recorded at the Desertfest in London, England on April 27, 2013.

Track 1 is from the Unida/Dozer double EP. Tracks 4 and 5 are from the unreleased second album of the band, intended for release in 2001 on American Recordings. The rest of the songs are from Coping with the Urban Coyote.

Personnel
 John Garcia – vocals
 Dave Dinsmore – bass
 Arthur Seay – guitars
 Miguel Cancino – drums
 Produced by Steve Feldman & Unida

Notes
The song "Black Woman" was featured on the soundtrack of the 2003 video game Tony Hawk's Underground.

References

1999 albums
Man's Ruin Records albums
Unida albums